Profit or a portion of profit that can be legally distributed as a dividend to the shareholders is known as Divisible Profit. All profit of the company is not divisible and number of factors should be considered while determining divisible profit of the company.

Factors influencing the value of Divisible Profit 
Following are some factors that influence the value of divisible profit.
 Transfer to and Creation of reserve
 Creation of Dividend Equalization Reserve
 Working Capital Requirement of the company
 Dividend on Preference Share
 Past Dividend Payout History

References

Profit